Borbo bevani, the Beavan's swift, is a butterfly belonging to the family Hesperiidae. It is named after Captain Robert Cecil Beavan. It is found throughout India.

Description

References

Hesperiidae
Butterflies of Asia
Butterflies of Indochina